Chrysoesthia parilis is a moth of the family Gelechiidae. It is found in Ethiopia.

The larvae feed on Achyranthes aspera.

References

Moths described in 1963
Chrysoesthia